Shenetal Rural District is in Kuhsar District of Salmas County, West Azerbaijan province, Iran. At the National Census of 2006, its population was 10,950 in 1,955 households. There were 9,494 inhabitants in 1,968 households at the following census of 2011. At the most recent census of 2016, the population of the rural district was 9,931 in 2,276 households. The largest of its 33 villages was Kuzehrash, with 1,501 people.

References 

Salmas County

Rural Districts of West Azerbaijan Province

Populated places in West Azerbaijan Province

Populated places in Salmas County